"The Prime Mover" is episode 57 of the American television anthology series The Twilight Zone. It originally aired on March 24, 1961 on CBS.

Opening narration

Plot
Small-time gambler Ace Larsen discovers that his partner, Jimbo Cobb, has telekinetic powers after a car overturns outside their café and Jimbo moves the car without touching it.

Ace plans to use Jimbo's powers to win big in Las Vegas, and he takes his girlfriend Kitty with them. Ace wins many jackpots, disregarding Jimbo's headaches from the use of his powers and his growing moral concerns over what they are doing. Kitty is repulsed and leaves, so Ace uses his newly acquired cash to lure the attention of the casino's cigarette girl and bets the pile in a game of craps, just as Jimbo's powers appear to "run out". The loss awakens Ace to the reality of what he has become, and he and Jimbo have a good laugh over their misfortune. The three return home. 

Back at the café, Ace asks Kitty to marry him just as Jimbo drops his broom. She flips a coin, and Ace calls "heads". Kitty doesn't show Ace the coin or tell him the result of the coin toss; Kitty simply accepts his proposal. As they embrace, Jimbo picks up the broom telekinetically, revealing he faked his loss of power to snap Ace out of his greed.

Closing narration

Cast
Dane Clark as Ace Larsen
Buddy Ebsen as Jimbo Cobb
Christine White as Kitty Cavanaugh
William Keene as Desk clerk
Nesdon Booth as Big Phil Nolan 
Clancy Cooper as Trucker
Jane Burgess as Sheila

Production
The crash scene re-uses footage from the 1958 film Thunder Road.

See also
 List of The Twilight Zone (1959 TV series) episodes

References
DeVoe, Bill. (2008). Trivia from The Twilight Zone. Albany, GA: Bear Manor Media. 
Grams, Martin. (2008). The Twilight Zone: Unlocking the Door to a Television Classic. Churchville, MD: OTR Publishing.

External links
 

1961 American television episodes
The Twilight Zone (1959 TV series season 2) episodes
Television shows written by Charles Beaumont
Television episodes about telekinesis
Television episodes written by George Clayton Johnson
Television episodes set in Las Vegas